The Western Conference is one of two conferences that make up the National Basketball Association (NBA), the other being the Eastern Conference. Both conferences consist of 15 teams organized into three divisions.

The current divisional alignment was adopted at the start of the 2004–05 season, when the now Charlotte Hornets began play as the NBA's 30th franchise. This necessitated the move of the New Orleans Pelicans from the Eastern Conference's Central Division to the newly created Southwest Division of the Western Conference.

The NBA first started awarding a Western Conference championship trophy during the 2000–01 season, renaming it after Hall of Famer Oscar Robertson in the 2021–22 season. Also in 2021–22, the league began awarding the Earvin "Magic" Johnson Trophy to the Western Conference Finals Most Valuable Player, named after Hall of Famer Magic Johnson.

Current standings

Teams

Former teams

Notes
 denotes an expansion team.
 denotes a team that merged from the American Basketball Association (ABA).
Seattle supersonics

Team timeline

Conference champions

Western Conference championships by team
 19: Los Angeles Lakers
 7: Golden State Warriors
 6: San Antonio Spurs
 4: Houston Rockets
 4: Seattle SuperSonics / Oklahoma City Thunder
 3: Phoenix Suns
 3: Portland Trail Blazers
 2: Dallas Mavericks
 2: Milwaukee Bucks
 2: Utah Jazz
 0: Memphis Grizzlies
 0: Denver Nuggets
 0: Minnesota Timberwolves
 0: New Orleans Pelicans
 0: Los Angeles Clippers
 0: Sacramento Kings

Season results

Notes
 The New Orleans Hornets temporarily relocated to Oklahoma City due to the effect of Hurricane Katrina. The majority of home games were played in Oklahoma City, while a few remained in New Orleans.

References

Western Conference (NBA)
Sports in the Western United States